Internal Exile ("A Collection of a Boy's Own Stories") was Fish's second solo album after leaving Marillion in 1988. The album, released 28 October 1991, was inspired by the singer's past, his own personal problems and his troubled experiences with his previous record label EMI.

The album's music reflects Fish's indulgence in the vast regions of music that he wanted to explore as a solo artist; most notably Celtic music and folk styles. The album also has many concert staples such as "Credo", "Tongues" and "Internal Exile" featuring on a number of Fish's official bootleg recordings.

As on Vigil, Fish deals with themes important to him. The song "Internal Exile" speaks of his strong national pride and his desire for independence for Scotland. "Credo" is another song dealing with social problems and globalisation, echoing "State of Mind", his first solo single.

The album was produced by Chris Kimsey, and dedicated to Fish's daughter Tara.

A remastered version was released by Roadrunner Records on 26 October 1998.

Track listing
"Shadowplay" – 06:23 (Dick, Mickey Simmonds)
"Credo" – 06:40 (Dick, Simmonds, Robin Boult, Frank Usher)
"Just Good Friends (Close)" - 06:00 (Dick, Usher, Boult, Simmonds)
"Favourite Stranger" - 05:58 (Dick, Usher)
"Lucky" - 04:50 (Dick, Boult, Simmonds)
"Dear Friend" - 04:08 (Dick, Boult, Simmonds)
"Tongues" – 06:22 (Dick, Simmonds, Usher, Boult)
"Internal Exile" – 04:45 (Dick, Boult, Simmonds)
"Something in the Air" – 05:08 (Speedy Keen) (Track missing from Vinyl release)

Bonus tracks on remastered edition (1998)
<LI>"Poet's Moon" - 04:26 (Dick, Simmonds, Boult, Usher)
<LI>"Carnival Man" - 06:25 (Dick, Boult, Ted McKenna, Simmonds, Usher, David Paton)

Singles
"Internal Exile" (Released 9 September 1991) 7" Single, 12" Single, 12" Picture Disk Single and CD Single
"Credo" (Released 2 December 1991) 7" Single, 12" Single and CD Single
"Something in the Air" (released 22 June 1992) 7" Single, 12" Single and CD Single (one version released with "Shadow Play" live and the other with "Dear Friend" live)

Personnel
 Lead Vocal: Derek W Dick (Fish)
 Keyboards: Mickey Simmonds
 Guitars: Robin Boult & Frank Usher
 Bass Guitar: David Paton
 Drums and percussion: Ethan Johns except "Tongues" & "Internal Exile" Ted McKenna
 Male Backing Vocals: David Paton, Mr Crimson, Robin Boult
 Female Backing Vocals: Maryen Cairns
 Fiddle on "Internal Exile": Charlie McKerron
 Whistles: Marc Duff
 Box Accordion: Donald Shaw

Charts

References

1991 albums
Fish (singer) albums
Albums produced by Chris Kimsey
Polydor Records albums